Ibrahim Omar Dabbashi (born 25 February 1950) is a Libyan diplomat who formerly served as the Libyan Permanent Representative to the United Nations in New York. Dabbashi led the country's UN mission in opposing the continued rule of Muammar Gaddafi.

Dabbashi was born in Sabratha, Libya. He obtained a Bachelor of Arts degree from Al Fateh University in 1974 and joined the Libyan Ministry of Foreign Affairs in 1975.

In January 2009, Dabbashi became the deputy Permanent Representative of Libya to the United Nations in New York. In March 2009, he served a term as the President of the United Nations Security Council.

In February 2011, Dabbashi announced that he and the other members of Libya's UN mission were calling on Gaddafi to resign and that crimes against humanity and war crimes had been committed in Libya by the regime.

In November 2011, after the fall of Gaddafi's government, it was reported that Dabbashi would be appointed as Libya's foreign minister by the National Transitional Council, but the reports proved incorrect when Ashour Bin Khayal was appointed to the position.

Education

Dabbashi earned a BA in French Language and Literature from the University of Alfateh in 1974 and a diploma in Refugee Law from the International Institute of Humanitarian Law in 2005.

Languages
Dabbashi is fluent in Arabic, French, and English.

Work experience
 Permanent Representative Of Libya To the United Nations, New York, Jul 2013 – August 2016
 Deputy Permanent Representative Of Libya To the United Nations, New York City from Jan 2009 - Jul 2013
 Deputy Permanent Representative of Libya at the UN Security Council, Jan 2008 – Dec 2009
 President of the UN Security Council, March 2009
 Ambassador at the Libyan Mission To the United Nations, New York, Sep 2007 –
 Deputy Director and Acting Director Department of International Organizations Jan 2004 – Sep 2007
 Head of Division Department of International Organizations In charge of Political and Disarmament and International Security Issues, Jul 2002 – Jan 2004
 Minister Plenipotentiary Libyan Embassy in Bonn/Berlin, Germany Jul 1998 – Jun 2002
 Acting Director Department of International Organizations Aug 1997 – Jan 1998
 Head of Division Department of International Organizations Nov 1996 – Jul 1998
 Political Advisor to the Secretariat of the General People's Congress, Jun 1995 – Oct 1996
 Head of Eastern European Division Secretariat for Foreign Affairs, Oct 1992 – Apr 1995
 Counselor Libyan Embassy, Belgrade, Yugoslavia, Jul 1988 – Jul 1992
 Head of Non-aligned Division Secretariat for Foreign Affairs, July 1985 – Jun 1988
 Rapporteur of the Fourth Committee 36th Session of the United Nations General Assembly, 1981
 Second, then First Secretary Libyan Mission to the United Nations New York, Nov 1980 – Apr 1985
 Assistant to Head of the Division Of the Organisation of African Unity Secretariat for Foreign Affairs, Mar – Oct 1980
 Head of Central Africa Desk Department of Africa
 Secretariat for Foreign Affairs, Feb 1978 – Mar 1980
 Third Secretary Libyan Embassy, Chad Aug 1975 – Jan 1978
 Attache's Assistant to the Head of the Political Division Department of Africa Ministry of Foreign Affairs Jan/Aug 1975
 Joined Ministry of Foreign Affairs Jan 1975

Participation in international and regional forums

United Nations and Related Meetings

 Review Conference of the Nuclear Non-Proliferation Treaty, New York, 2010
 The 59th, 60th, 61st, 62nd, 63rd and 64th Ordinary Sessions of the United Nations General Assembly, from 2004 to 2010
 The 5th Session of the Human Rights Council, Geneva, June 2007
 Workshop on the Program of Action on the illicit trade in Small Arms and Light Weapons, in all its aspects, Tunisia, June 2004
 Regional Workshop on Military and Humanitarian Issues related to the Ottawa Treaty on Antipersonnel mines, Amman, Jordan, 2004
 The 5th and 6th Sessions of the Intergovernmental Group of Experts of the States Parties to the CCW, Geneva, 2003
 Resumed 6th Session of the conference of the Parties to the United Nations Framework Convention on Climate Change, Bonn, Germany, 2001
 Convention to Combat Desertification, Bonn, Germany, 2000
 The 5th Session of the Conference of the Parties to the United Nations Framework Convention on Climate Change, Bonn, Germany, 1999
 First Periodical Meeting on International Humanitarian Law, Geneva, 1998
 All Special Session and Emergency Special Sessions of the United Nations General Assembly, held between December 1980 and 1985
 The 34th, 35th, 36th, 37th, 38th, 39th, Ordinary Sessions of the United Nations General Assembly, from 1979 to 1984
 The 9th Special Session of the United Nations General Assembly on Namibia, April 25 – May 3, 1978

Organisation of African Unity/ African Union Meetings
 The 16th and 17th Summit Conferences of the Organisation of African Unity, Khartoum and Monrovia, 1978 & 1979
 The 30th, 31st, 32nd and 33rd Ordinary Session of the Council of Ministers of the Organisation of African Unity, held successively in Khartoum, 1978, Nairobi, 1979, Monrovia, 1979 and Addis Ababa, 1980 Non-Aligned Movement Meetings
 The 14th Summit Conference of the NAM, Havana, Cuba, September 2006
 Asian-African Summit, Jakarta, Indonesia, April 2005
 The 15th Ministerial Conference of the NAM, Durban, South Africa, 2004
 The 13th Summit Conference of the NAM, Kuala Lumpur, Malaysia, 2003
 The 12th Ministerial Conference of the NAM, New Delhi, India, 1997
 The 11th Ministerial Conference of the NAM, Cairo, Egypt, 1994
 The 9th Summit Conference of the NAM, Belgrade, Yugoslavia, 1989
 Ministerial Meeting of the Coordinating Bureau of the NAM, Harare, Zimbabwe, May 1989
 Meeting of the Ministerial Conference of the Non-aligned Countries on the Role and Methodology of the movement, Nicosia, Cyprus, 1989
 Ministerial Conference of the NAM, Nicosia, Cyprus, 1988
 Special Ministerial Conference of the NAM on South-South Cooperation, PiongYang, Democratic People’s Republic of Korea, 1987
 The 2nd Ministerial Conference of Non-aligned Mediterranean Countries, Brioni, Yugoslavia 1987
 The 8th Summit Conference of the NAM, Harare, Zimbabwe, 1986
 Ministerial Conference of the Coordinating Bureau, New Delhi, India, 1986
 Ministerial Conference of the NAM, Luanda, Angola, 1985
 Ministerial Conference of the Coordination Bureau, Havana, Cuba, 1982 League of Arab States Meetings
 The 17th Ordinary Arab Summit, Algiers, Algeria, March 2005 Parliamentary Meetings
 The 4th Conference of the Parliamentary Union of the Members of the OIC, Dakar, Senegal, 2004
 Afro-Arab Parliamentary conference, Cotonou, Benin, 1998
 Special Conference of the Arab Parliamentary Union on Terrorism, Luxor, Egypt, 1998
 The 33rd Session on the African Parliamentary Union, Tripoli, Libya, 1996
 The 6th and the 7th Conferences of the Arab Parliamentary Union, Rabat, Morocco, 1995, and Damascus, Syria 1996
 The meeting of the Interparliamentary Union on Peace and Cooperation in the Mediterranean, Alexandria, Egypt, 1995
 The 2nd Inter-parliamentary conference on Security and Cooperation in the Mediterranean, Valletta, Malta, 1995
 The 92nd, 93rd, 94th, 96th, 98th and 102nd Inter-parliamentary Conferences, Copenhagen 1994, Madrid 1995, Bucharest 1995, Beijing 1996, Cairo 1997 Berlin 1999
He participated as a member of Libyan Delegations to several countries

Notes

http://www.libyanmission-un.org
http://www.dabbashi.org

1950 births
Living people
Libyan diplomats
University of Tripoli alumni
People from Zawiya District
People from Sabratha
Permanent Representatives of Libya to the United Nations